Johann "Hans" Zehetner (4 September 1912 – 29 December 1942) was an Austrian field handball player who competed in the 1936 Summer Olympics. He was part of the Austrian field handball team, which won the silver medal. He played two matches.

He was killed in action during World War II.

References

External links
profile

1912 births
1942 deaths
Austrian male handball players
Olympic handball players of Austria
Field handball players at the 1936 Summer Olympics
Olympic silver medalists for Austria
Olympic medalists in handball
Medalists at the 1936 Summer Olympics
Austrian military personnel killed in World War II